The Tidal pools of Leça da Palmeira is swimming area on the beach of Leça da Palmeira, along the coast of the civil parish of Matosinhos e Leça da Palmeira, municipality of Matosinhos, in the Portuguese northern district of Porto. The structures consist of two natural pools filled with fresh sea water, designed and built between 1959 and 1973 by Portuguese architect Álvaro Siza Vieira. Situated  from the Boa Nova tearoom and restaurant, it is considered one of Siza Vieira early projects.

History

In 1961, the initial project, which foresaw the construction of a bar along the southern edge of the pool, was never realized. 

The current facility was completed in 1966. To architect Alves Costa, the structure was an attempt at integration at the site, that created an artificial world within the natural landscape, as if the artificial was normal to nature.

But, by 2004, the facilities were in a complete state of ruin and abandoned by the local public. It was in early 2004 (5 February) that a dispatch was issued to open the process to classify the site.

Architecture
The facility is situated on the rocky outcrops in a linear form, paralleling the Avenida da Liberdade and ocean, framed by the landscape.

The saltwater pool, has an irregular, rectangular plan, constructed over the outcrops and structured along the linear wall that delimits the beach. Access to the structure is conditioned by a route framed by raw cement, along which there are orthogonal and linear views that induce the view to look at focal points of the landscape. Below the walls are various support structures.

References

Notes

References
 
 

Swimming venues in Portugal
Tidal pools Leca Palmeira
Tidal pool Leca Palmeira
Álvaro Siza Vieira buildings
Modernist architecture in Portugal